Vattenfall is a Swedish multinational power company owned by the Swedish State. Beyond Sweden, the company generates power in Denmark, Finland, Germany, the Netherlands, and the United Kingdom.

The company's name is Swedish for "waterfall", and is an abbreviation of its original name, Royal Waterfall Board (Kungliga Vattenfallstyrelsen).

History
Vattenfall (then called Kungliga Vattenfallsstyrelsen or Royal Waterfall Board) was founded in 1909 as a state-owned enterprise in Sweden. From its founding until the mid-1970s, Vattenfall's business was largely restricted to Sweden, with a focus on hydroelectric power generation. Only in 1974 did the company begin to build nuclear reactors in Sweden (the Ringhals 1 and 2 reactors), eventually owning seven of Sweden's 12 reactors. In 1992, Vattenfall was reformed as the limited liability company Vattenfall AB. At the same time, the transmission grid (220 kV and 400 kV lines) was transferred to the newly formed state agency Svenska kraftnät, which also became responsible for the operation of the national power system.

In the years 1990 through 2009, Vattenfall expanded considerably (especially into Germany, Poland and the Netherlands), acquiring stakes in Hämeen Sähkö (1996), HEW (1999, 25.1% stake from the city of Hamburg), the Polish heat production company EW (2000, 55% stake), Elsam A/S (2005, 35.3% stake), and Nuon (2009, 49% stake, today 100%). In 2002, Vattenfall AB and its acquisitions were incorporated as Vattenfall Europe AG, making it the third-largest electricity producer in Germany.

Following the expansion period, Vattenfall started to divest parts of its business in Denmark and Poland during the years following 2009 in a strategy to focus on three core markets: Sweden, Netherlands, and Germany. Write-downs on coal-fired and nuclear power plant assets in Germany and gas power plants in the Netherlands were necessary for a difficult market environment with increasing renewable energy market share and due to the German Nuclear power phase-out decision of 2011. In summer 2013 Vattenfall announced a write-down of the value of its assets by 29.7 billion SEK (US$4.6 billion). A major part of these write-offs were attributed to Nuon Energy NV, a Netherlands-based utility that Vattenfall purchased at an 89 billion SEK (ca. US$15 billion) price in 2009, but whose values were depreciating by 15 billion SEK (ca. US$2 billion) since. The gloomy market outlook of decreasing power prices in combination with increasing risks notably on the continental market prompted the board to revise the group strategy by splitting its organizational structure into a Nordic part and a part with operations in continental Europe and the United Kingdom as of 2014. Some analysts have perceived this strategic review as a precursor to a partial retreat from continental European activities with a shift of focus towards activities in the Scandinavian market. In this context and in response to a local referendum on re-municipilization of distribution grids, Vattenfall agreed on the sale of company-owned electricity and district-heat grids in Hamburg to the City of Hamburg in early 2014. In each of the second quarters of 2015 and 2016, Vattenfall filed impairments of SEK 28 billion, mostly due to lignite power stations in Germany. Operational financials were satisfactory. In 2020, Vattenfall reported a profit of SEK 7,716 billion with an operating profit (EBIT) of SEK 15,276 billion.

Outside of Sweden, Vattenfall is known for forcing the Soviet government to publicly reveal the Chernobyl disaster.  The Kremlin had tried to cover up the accident for a day, but elevated radiation levels at Vattenfall's Forsmark Nuclear Power Plant forced the Kremlin to admit the accident had occurred.

In October 2020, it was announced that Gunnar Groebler, senior vice president at Vattenfall responsible for the company's wind power operations, would leave the organisation to join Salzgitter AG. 

Magnus Hall, President and CEO from October 2014, decided to leave the company in July 2020 and was succeeded by Anna Borg on November 1, 2020.

Expansion beyond Sweden

In 2006, Vattenfall began production of the pilot carbon capture and storage (CCS) plant at Schwarze Pumpe, Germany. In 2007, the Lillgrund Wind Farm off the southern coast of Sweden was commissioned and began delivering electricity.

Vattenfall has power generation branches in the core markets Sweden, Germany, the Netherlands, United Kingdom, and Denmark, and also has operations in Finland. In Germany, Vattenfall is the electric utility for the states of Hamburg, Mecklenburg-Vorpommern, Brandenburg, Berlin, Saxony-Anhalt, Thuringia, and Saxony.

The company entered the British retail energy market in June 2017, but announced in November 2019 that it is considering to pull out again, citing unfavourable market conditions including strong competition and government-imposed price controls. The company remains one of the largest operators in UK offshore wind  and operates the largest onshore windfarm in England and Wales.

Generation
As of 2019, renewables accounted for 35% of the firm's total generation capacity, including wind, solar and hydro power.

Some of Vattenfall's most notable power generation plants include the 110 MW Lillgrund Wind Farm off the coast of Malmö, Sweden, the world's largest offshore wind farm of that time at Thanet, UK, the nuclear reactors Brunsbüttel Nuclear Power Plant (67% ownership), Krümmel Nuclear Power Plant (50% ownership), Brokdorf Nuclear Power Plant (20% ownership) in Germany, and the Forsmark Nuclear Power Plant and Ringhals Nuclear Power Plant in Sweden. The nuclear power stations of Brunsbüttel and Krümmel have been shut down permanently in response to a governmental order in summer 2011 after the Fukushima Daiichi nuclear disaster.

Vattenfall also operates biomass and other power plants in Germany and the Netherlands.

Exit from German lignite coal

Until 2016, Vattenfall owned several open pit coal mines digging up lignite for Vattenfall lignite power stations, including the Jänschwalde Power Station, the Boxberg Power Station, the Lippendorf Power Station (owned in part) and the Schwarze Pumpe Power Station. In 2014, Vattenfall had a lignite turnover of €2.3 billion and a profit of €647 million, but later lost money on lignite as power prices decreased from 40 to 20 €/MWh. On 30September 2016, Vattenfall completed the sale of its German lignite facilities to the Czech energy group EPH and its financial partner PPF Investments.

Nuclear generation
In January 2016, Vattenfall announced that its Swedish nuclear power plants, including the newer reactors, were operating at a loss due to low electricity prices and Sweden's nuclear output tax. It warned that if it was forced to shut the plants down, there would be serious consequences to Sweden's electricity supply, and argued that the nuclear output tax should be scrapped.

In October 2016 Vattenfall began litigation against the German government for its 2011 decision to accelerate the phase-out of nuclear power.  Hearings are taking place at the World Bank's International Centre for Settlement of Investment Disputes (ICSID) in Washington, D.C. and Vattenfall is claiming almost €4.7billion in damages. The German government regards the action as "inadmissible and unfounded".

Carbon intensity

Distribution

Vattenfall dominates the electrical distribution in 60 municipalities in Sweden. Other major grid companies include Ellevio (formerly Fortum) and E.ON.

Car seatbelt
The development of the safety belt is often incorrectly credited to Saab or Volvo. Fatal car accidents were rapidly increasing in Sweden during the 1950s. When a study at Vattenfall of accidents among employees revealed that the majority of casualties came from car accidents, two Vattenfall engineers (Bengt Odelgard and Per-Olof Weman) started to develop the safety belt. Their work set the standard for safety belts in Swedish cars and was presented to Volvo in the late 1950s.

Criticism

Vattenfall's past expansion strategy has involved the acquisition of multiple brown coal (lignite)-fired power plants, which has been highly controversial in Sweden and Germany due to the fact that brown coal is among the most carbon-intensive forms of electricity generation. In addition, brown coal is strip mined in a process that sometimes forces communities to relocate as mining fields expand. Vattenfall sold its brown coal assets in September 2016 to Czech investor EPH .

In May 2009, campaign group Corporate Europe Observatory (CEO) launched the Climate Greenwash Awards, declaring Vattenfall the inaugural winner for portraying itself as a climate champion while lobbying to continue business as usual. Vattenfall owns (or has owned) four of the "dirty thirty" most polluting power stations in Europe, a list compiled by WWF and other organizations.

A fire in the transformer of the nuclear power plant Krümmel (partly owned with E.ON) in 2007 forced a closure of the power plant for over two years, while a short circuit in July 2009 in another transformer led to another closure. Due to these incidents the Prime Minister of Schleswig-Holstein, Germany, Peter Harry Carstensen announced that this will be letzter Versuch (their last try) before complete closure of the facility.

Vattenfall has been accused of skirting the line of illegality in its effort to maintain ownership of electrical power grids. Most recently, Vattenfall's efforts to maintain ownership of Hamburg's power grid by lobbying the ruling SPD have drawn criticism.

In Germany, the Berlin Energy Table (Berliner Energietisch) alliance united a number of NGOs and local groups initiating a Referendum on the recommunalization of energy supply in Berlin. The referendum took place on November 3, 2013, yet slightly missed the quorum. However, the Senate of Berlin promised to match the citizens' initiative's key claim, regardless of the referendum's outcome: to transfer all end-user operations, which were owned by Vattenfall at the time, to a public utility company. The company was founded in 2014 as "Berliner Stadtwerke."

See also
 Svenska kraftnät
 European Transmission System Operators
 List of government enterprises of Sweden
 List of Swedish companies
 Scotland-Norway interconnector
 Vattenfall Cyclassics – a cycle race in Hamburg

References

External links

Yahoo - Vattenfall AB Company Profile at Yahoo!
Biq Location Development and Real Estate Services - Management and marketing of industrial space, subsidiary of Vattenfall Europe AG
RWE, E.ON and Vattenfall top the list of European CO2 emitters in 2008
Vattenfall demands $6 billion in compensation from Germany.
Vattenfall enter the UK consumer energy market by buying iSupplyEnergy

 
Companies based in Solna Municipality
Government-owned companies of Sweden
Electric power companies of Sweden
Nuclear power companies of Sweden
Energy companies established in 1909
Non-renewable resource companies established in 1909
1909 establishments in Sweden
Swedish brands
Electric power distribution network operators in Sweden
Government-owned energy companies
Electricity retailers in Sweden